This article describes the qualification for the 2019 Men's European Volleyball Championship.

Qualification
Belgium, France, Netherlands and Slovenia as host countries were directly qualified. The eight best placed teams at the 2017 edition also gained direct entries into the tournament.
26 teams had registered for participation and compete for the remaining 12 places at the final tournament. The 26 teams were divided into seven pools of three or four teams. The pool winners and the best five runners-up advanced to the final round.

Direct qualification
2017 Men's European Volleyball Championship final standing

Format
There being seven pools of either three or four teams each, the winners of each pool and the 5 best runners-up will qualify for the 2019 EuroVolley. The pools will be played in a home and away round-robin format officially from 15 August 2018 to 9 January 2019, according to the CEV web site. In reality, the matches are scheduled for the second half of August 2018 and the first part of January 2019. Since there is a different number of teams across the seven pools, the results of the matches played with the teams finishing last in the pools of four will be discarded in order to determine the five best runners-up across all pools. The pools composition results from the latest European Ranking for men's and women's national teams – as of 4 September and 2 October 2017, respectively – with teams being placed across the pools according to the serpentine system.

Pool standing procedure
 Number of matches won
 Match points
 Sets ratio
 Points ratio
 If the tie continues as per the point ratio between two teams, the priority will be given to the team which won the last match between them. When the tie in points ratio is between three or more teams, a new classification of these teams in the terms of points 1, 2 and 3 will be made taking into consideration only the matches in which they were opposed to each other.

Match won 3–0 or 3–1: 3 match points for the winner, 0 match points for the loser
Match won 3–2: 2 match points for the winner, 1 match point for the loser

Results
All times are local.
The winners in each pool and the top five of the second ranked teams qualified for the 2019 European Championship.

Pool A

|}

|}

Pool B

|}

|}

Pool C

|}

|}

Pool D

|}

|}

Pool E

|}

|}

Pool F

|}

|}

Pool G

|}

|}

Ranking of the second placed teams
Matches against the fourth placed team in each pool are not included in this ranking.
The top five of the second placed teams qualified for the 2019 European Championship.

|}

References

External links
Official website 

Q
European Volleyball Championship
European Volleyball Championship
Qualification for volleyball competitions